Adductores may refer to:
 Adductor brevis muscle
 Adductor longus muscle
 Adductor magnus muscle